Tropical Medicine & International Health is a peer-reviewed medical journal that covers malaria, HIV, tuberculosis, neglected infectious diseases, water and sanitation, public health, etc. The journal is published by Wiley.

Abstracting and indexing 
The journal is abstracted and indexed in:

 Abstracts in Anthropology (Sage)
 Abstracts on Hygiene & Communicable Diseases (CABI)
 Academic Search (EBSCO Publishing)
 Academic Search Alumni Edition (EBSCO Publishing)
 Academic Search Elite (EBSCO Publishing)
 Academic Search Premier (EBSCO Publishing)
 AgBiotech News & Information (CABI)
 AgBiotechNet (CABI)

According to the Journal Citation Reports, the journal has a 2021 impact factor of 3.918.

References

External links 

 

English-language journals
Tropical medicine and hygiene journals
ISSN needed
Publications with year of establishment missing